Ustriclapex speculatrix is a moth of the family Tortricidae. It is found in the Khasi Hills of Assam, India.

References

Moths described in 1907
Eucosmini